Gorenje Laknice is a settlement south of Mokronog in the Municipality of Mokronog-Trebelno in southeastern Slovenia. The area is part of the historical region of Lower Carniola. The municipality is now included in the Southeast Slovenia Statistical Region. 

The local church in the settlement is dedicated to Saint Judoc and belongs to the Parish of Mokronog. It is an originally medieval building that was restyled in the Baroque in the mid-18th century.

References

External links
Gorenje Laknice on Geopedia

Populated places in the Municipality of Mokronog-Trebelno